Pál Bedák (born September 8, 1985 in Budapest) is a boxer from Hungary best known to win the silver medal at the 2005 World Championships. His older brother Zsolt Bedák is a bantamweight boxer.

At his international debut Bedák won the European Cadet Championships in 2002. As a junior, he won the European Junior Championships (2003) and the Junior World Championships (2004), where he beat future world champion Sergey Vodopyanov  in  the final. Bedák won the bronze medal at the 2004 European Championships in Pula.

He participated in the 2004 Summer Olympics for his native European country. There he was defeated in the first round of the light flyweight division by Azerbaijan's Jeyhun Abiyev. He later won the silver medal at the 2005 World Championships losing to Chinese Zou Shiming.

At the  2007 World Championships he made an early exit against European champion David Ayrapetyan, at the 2008 Summer Olympics  he was edged out in his first bout 7:8 by Birzhan Zhakypov.

Professional career
He turned pro in 2008 and signed a contract to fight for Hamburg-based Universum Box-Promotion.  He trains together with two fellow-Hungarian world champions Zsolt Erdei and Károly Balzsay.

External links

References
 Yahoo! Sports
 sports-reference

1985 births
Living people
Flyweight boxers
Boxers at the 2004 Summer Olympics
Boxers at the 2008 Summer Olympics
Olympic boxers of Hungary
Boxers from Budapest
Hungarian male boxers
AIBA World Boxing Championships medalists